Evert Basch, from Verizon Inc., was named Fellow of the Institute of Electrical and Electronics Engineers (IEEE) in 2014 for advancing the deployment of fiber-optic communication systems in carrier networks.

References

20th-century births
Living people
21st-century American engineers
Fellow Members of the IEEE
Year of birth missing (living people)
Place of birth missing (living people)
Verizon Communications people
American electrical engineers